Bucharest Airport may refer to:

 Henri Coandă International Airport serving Bucharest, Romania - located in the neighbouring town of Otopeni, Ilfov County
 Aurel Vlaicu International Airport serving Bucharest, Romania - located in the district of Băneasa
 Bucharest Alexeni Airport, a project for a new airport aiming to serve low-cost airlines